The 1970–71 Seattle SuperSonics season was the Seattle SuperSonics 4th season in the National Basketball Association (NBA). In their second season with Lenny Wilkens as head coach, the Sonics finished in 8th place in the Western Conference with a 38–44 record. 

Trouble arose with the injury of top scorer Bob Rule, who tore his Achilles tendon three games into the season during a game against the Portland Trail Blazers and lost him for the remainder of the season.

Offseason
During the offseason, the SuperSonics traded 10-year veteran Bob Boozer and their first round selection from the 1969 NBA draft, Lucius Allen to the Milwaukee Bucks for Don Smith (later known as Zaid Abdul-Aziz). Despite the early retirement announcement made by 24-year-old Smith to the Sonics' front office, he joined the team and played in 61 games in the regular season.

Draft picks

Note: only draft picks who participated in at least one game in the NBA are listed.

Roster

Depth chart

Regular season

Season standings

z – clinched division title
y – clinched division title
x – clinched playoff spot

Record vs. opponents

Game log

|- bgcolor=#fcc
| 1
| October 14
| Detroit
| L 117–123
| Bob Rule (37)
|
|
| Seattle Center Coliseum8,153
| 0–1

|- bgcolor=#cfc
| 2
| October 17
| Boston
| W 126–114
| Bob Rule (36)
|
|
| Seattle Center Coliseum11,617
| 1–1

|- bgcolor=#cfc
| 3
| October 21
| Phoenix
| W 110–106
| Bob Rule (25)
|
|
| Seattle Center Coliseum6,923
| 2–1

|- bgcolor=#cfc
| 4
| October 23
| Portland
| W 141–111
| Dick Snyder (25)
|
|
| Seattle Center Coliseum9,201
| 3–1

|- bgcolor=#fcc
| 5
| October 25
| @ Milwaukee
| L 107–126
|Dick Snyder (24)
|
|
| Milwaukee Arena9,340
| 3–2

|- bgcolor=#fcc
| 6
| October 26
| @ Detroit
| L 111–142
|Don Smith (19)
|
|
| Cobo Arena2,835
| 3–3

|- bgcolor=#fcc
| 7
| October 27
| @ New York
| L 104–117
|Lenny Wilkens (24)
|
|
| Madison Square Garden14,471
| 3–4

|- bgcolor=#fcc
| 8
| October 28
| @ Cincinnati
| L 118–131
|Don Smith (25)
|
|
| Cincinnati Gardens1,623
| 3–5

|- bgcolor=#cfc
| 9
| October 30
| @ Portland
| W 115–104
|Lenny Wilkens (35)
|
|
| Memorial Coliseum4,344
| 4–5

|- bgcolor=#cfc
| 10
| October 31
| Chicago
| W 122–119
|Lenny Wilkens (26)
|
|
| Seattle Center Coliseum5,727
| 5–5

|- bgcolor=#fcc
| 11
| November 3
| @ Chicago
| L 101–113
|Lenny Wilkens (18)
|
|
| Chicago Stadium8,244
| 5–6

|- bgcolor=#cfc
| 12
| November 4
| @ Buffalo
| W 126–101
|Tom Meschery (22)
|
|
| Buffalo Memorial Auditorium2,093
| 6–6

|- bgcolor=#fcc
| 13
| November 6
| @ Boston
| L 94–116
|Dick Snyder (28)
|
|
| Boston Garden5,852
| 6–7

|- bgcolor=#fcc
| 14
| November 7
| @ Philadelphia
| L 128–134
|Lenny Wilkens (32)
|
|
| The Spectrum7,623
| 6–8

|- bgcolor=#cfc
| 15
| November 8
| @ Cleveland
| W 111–105
|Dick Snyder (30)
|
|
| Cleveland Arena2,448
| 7–8

|- bgcolor=#cfc
| 16
| November 10
| New York
| W 93–91
|Dick Snyder (26)
|
|
| Seattle Center Coliseum11,022
| 8–8

|- bgcolor=#cfc
| 17
| November 13
| Cleveland
| W 111–91
|Dick Snyder (26)
|
|
| Seattle Center Coliseum6,961
| 9–8

|- bgcolor=#fcc
| 18
| November 16
| Buffalo
| L 103–112
|Dick Snyder (20)
|
|
| Portland, OR3,189
| 9–9

|- bgcolor=#cfc
| 19
| November 19
| Los Angeles
| W 111–110
|Don Kojis (26)
|
|
| Seattle Center Coliseum9,717
| 10–9

|- bgcolor=#fcc
| 20
| November 20
| @ San Diego
| L 106–121
|Three players (17)
|
|
| San Diego Sports Arena4,211
| 10–10

|- bgcolor=#fcc
| 21
| November 21
| San Diego
| L 114–115
|Lee Winfield (36)
|
|
| Seattle Center Coliseum11,316
| 10–11

|- bgcolor=#fcc
| 22
| November 22
| @ Los Angeles
| L 124–149
|snyuder (29)
|
|
| The Forum11,763
| 10–12

|- bgcolor=#fcc
| 23
| November 26
| @ Phoenix
| L 115–126
|Lee Winfield (19)
|
|
| Arizona Veterans Memorial Coliseum7,192
| 10–13

|- bgcolor=#cfc
| 24
| November 27
| San Francisco
| W 101–96
|Lenny Wilkens (31)
|
|
| Seattle Center Coliseum10,024
| 11–13

|- bgcolor=#cfc
| 25
| November 29
| Atlanta
| W 130–107
|Lenny Wilkens (41)
|
|
| Seattle Center Coliseum12,965
| 12–13

|- bgcolor=#fcc
| 26
| December 1
| @ New York
| L 109–114
|Lenny Wilkens (29)
|
|
| Madison Square Garden17,449
| 12–14

|- bgcolor=#cfc
| 27
| December 2
| @ Cincinnati
| W 119–111
|Don Kojis (30)
|
|
| Cincinnati Gardens1,823
| 13–14

|- bgcolor=#fcc
| 28
| December 4
| @ Baltimore
| L 116–131
|Don Kojis, Dick Snyder (22)
|
|
| Baltimore Civic Center3,050
| 13–15

|- bgcolor=#fcc
| 29
| December 5
| @ Atlanta
| L 100–106
|Lenny Wilkens (17)
|
|
| Alexander Memorial Coliseum5,922
| 13–16

|- bgcolor=#cfc
| 30
| December 8
| @ Philadelphia
| W 107–104
|Three players (21)
|
|
| The Spectrum3,584
| 14–16

|- bgcolor=#fcc
| 31
| December 9
| @ Boston
| L 121–136
|Dick Snyder (28)
|
|
| Boston Garden4,608
| 14–17

|- bgcolor=#fcc
| 32
| December 11
| Los Angeles
| L 118–126
|Don Kojis (24)
|
|
| Seattle Center Coliseum10,685
| 14–18

|- bgcolor=#fcc
| 33
| December 13
| Milwaukee
| L 107–124
|Don Kojis (29)
|
|
| Seattle Center Coliseum12,627
| 14–19

|- bgcolor=#fcc
| 34
| December 16
| @ San Francisco
| L 91–108
|Lenny Wilkens (28)
|
|
| Oakland–Alameda County Coliseum Arena2,218
| 14–20

|- bgcolor=#fcc
| 35
| December 17
| Philadelphia
| L 117–125
|Lee Winfield (25)
|
|
| Seattle Center Coliseum4,739
| 14–21

|- bgcolor=#cfc
| 36
| December 19
| Phoenix
| W 135–131
|Don Kojis (36)
|
|
| Seattle Center Coliseum6,443
| 15–21

|- bgcolor=#fcc
| 37
| December 20
| San Diego
| L 108–110
|Lenny Wilkens (28)
|
|
| Seattle Center Coliseum5,702
| 15–22

|- bgcolor=#cfc
| 38
| December 22
| New York
| W 119–108
|Tom Meschery, Lenny Wilkens (20)
|
|
| Seattle Center Coliseum8,827
| 16–22

|- bgcolor=#cfc
| 39
| December 26
| Boston
| W 124–117
|Dick Snyder (29)
|
|
| Seattle Center Coliseum10,806
| 17–22

|- bgcolor=#cfc
| 40
| December 30
| Chicago
| W 128–109
|Dick Snyder (25)
|
|
| Seattle Center Coliseum12,935
| 18–22

|- bgcolor=#cfc
| 41
| January 1
| Portland
| W 121–118
|Lenny Wilkens (24)
|
|
| Seattle Center Coliseum9,012
| 19–22

|- bgcolor=#fcc
| 42
| January 4
| @ Milwaukee
| L 110–124
|Don Kojis (24)
|
|
| Milwaukee Arena8,835
| 19–23

|- bgcolor=#fcc
| 43
| January 5
| @ Baltimore
| L 101–109
|Lenny Wilkens (27)
|
|
| Baltimore Civic Center4,631
| 19–24

|- bgcolor=#fcc
| 44
| January 6
| @ Boston
| L 112–137
|Dick Snyder (26)
|
|
| Boston Garden4,152
| 19–25

|- bgcolor=#cfc
| 45
| January 8
| @ Buffalo
| W 110–102
|Lenny Wilkens (30)
|
|
| Buffalo Memorial Auditorium3,024
| 20–25

|- bgcolor=#cfc
| 46
| January 9
| @ Cincinnati
| W 114–110
|Don Kojis (29)
|
|
| Cincinnati Gardens3,879
| 21–25

|- bgcolor=#cfc
| 47
| January 14
| Baltimore
| W 114–110
|Lenny Wilkens (34)
|
|
| Clarence S. "Hec" Edmundson Pavilion7,093
| 22–25

|- bgcolor=#fcc
| 48
| January 17
| Baltimore
| L 96–111
|Lenny Wilkens (20)
|
|
| Clarence S. "Hec" Edmundson Pavilion7,557
| 22–26

|- bgcolor=#fcc
| 49
| January 19
| @ Detroit
| L 102–106
|Spencer Haywood (24)
|
|
| Cobo Arena5,287
| 22–27

|- bgcolor=#cfc
| 50
| January 20
| @ Atlanta
| W 112–108
|Lenny Wilkens (24)
|
|
| Alexander Memorial Coliseum4,661
| 23–27

|- bgcolor=#cfc
| 51
| January 22
| Cincinnati
| W 132–131 (OT)
|Spencer Haywood (30)
|
|
| Seattle Center Coliseum12,657
| 24–27

|- bgcolor=#fcc
| 52
| January 24
| Philadelphia
| L 119–145
|Spencer Haywood (30)
|
|
| Seattle Center Coliseum12,841
| 24–28

|- bgcolor=#cfc
| 53
| January 28
| Buffalo
| W 120–110
|Dick Snyder (35)
|
|
| Seattle Center Coliseum7,452
| 25–28

|- bgcolor=#fcc
| 54
| January 29
| @ Los Angeles
| L 115–122
|Dick Snyder (26)
|
|
| The Forum12,547
| 25–29

|- bgcolor=#fcc
| 55
| January 30
| @ Phoenix
| L 116–134
|Spencer Haywood (29)
|
|
| Arizona Veterans Memorial Coliseum10,412
| 25–30

|- bgcolor=#fcc
| 56
| February 2
| @ Chicago
| L 101–118
|Dick Snyder (24)
|
|
| Chicago Stadium8,813
| 25–31

|- bgcolor=#cfc
| 57
| February 3
| @ Cleveland
| W 98–95
|Lenny Wilkens (30)
|
|
| Cleveland Arena2,515
| 26–31

|- bgcolor=#fcc
| 58
| February 5
| Atlanta
| L 120–121 (OT)
|Lenny Wilkens (30)
|
|
| Seattle Center Coliseum13,136
| 26–32

|- bgcolor=#fcc
| 59
| February 7
| San Diego
| L 107–124
|Spencer Haywood (25)
|
|
| Seattle Center Coliseum8,259
| 26–33

|- bgcolor=#fcc
| 60
| February 9
| @ San Diego
| L 115–132
|Spencer Haywood (22)
|
|
| San Diego Sports Arena4,192
| 26–34

|- bgcolor=#fcc
| 61
| February 10
| @ San Francisco
| L 122–133
|Spencer Haywood (26)
|
|
| Oakland–Alameda County Coliseum Arena2,913
| 26–35

|- bgcolor=#cfc
| 62
| February 11
| Cincinnati
| W 119–101
|Dick Snyder (31)
|
|
| Seattle Center Coliseum13,013
| 27–35

|- bgcolor=#fcc
| 63
| February 12
| @ Portland
| L 125–137
|Lee Winfield (23)
|
|
| Memorial Coliseum7,313
| 27–36

|- bgcolor=#cfc
| 64
| February 14
| San Francisco
| W 146–101
|Spencer Haywood (25)
|
|
| Seattle Center Coliseum10,529
| 28–36

|- bgcolor=#cfc
| 65
| February 17
| Portland
| W 130–126
|Dick Snyder (25)
|
|
| Seattle Center Coliseum6,679
| 29–36

|- bgcolor=#fcc
| 66
| February 19
| Milwaukee
| L 112–128
|Dick Snyder (31)
|
|
| Seattle Center Coliseum12,685
| 29–37

|- bgcolor=#cfc
| 67
| February 21
| Philadelphia
| W 135–128
|Lenny Wilkens (28)
|
|
| Seattle Center Coliseum8,003
| 30–37

|- bgcolor=#cfc
| 68
| February 24
| Cleveland
| W 123–101
|Dick Snyder (24)
|
|
| Seattle Center Coliseum5,631
| 31–37

|- bgcolor=#fcc
| 69
| February 26
| @ Los Angeles
| L 121–145
|Tom Meschery (24)
|
|
| The Forum14,294
| 31–38

|- bgcolor=#fcc
| 70
| February 27
| Chicago
| L 114–129
|Don Kojis, Lee Winfield (20)
|
|
| Seattle Center Coliseum10,801
| 31–39

|- bgcolor=#fcc
| 71
| March 2
| Atlanta
| L 116–128
|Dick Snyder (22)
|
|
| Seattle Center Coliseum9,810
| 31–40

|- bgcolor=#cfc
| 72
| March 5
| @ San Diego
| W 111–110
|Dick Snyder (28)
|
|
| San Diego Sports Arena10,138
| 32–40

|- bgcolor=#cfc
| 73
| March 6
| Los Angeles
| W 121–109
|Don Smith (21)
|
|
| Seattle Center Coliseum12,949
| 33–40

|- bgcolor=#fcc
| 74
| March 8
| @ Milwaukee
| L 99–104
|Spencer Haywood (30)
|
|
| Milwaukee Arena10,746
| 33–41

|- bgcolor=#cfc
| 75
| March 9
| @ New York
| W 114–99
|Don Smith (37)
|
|
| Madison Square Garden19,500
| 34–41

|- bgcolor=#cfc
| 76
| March 11
| Detroit
| W 130–97
|Don Smith (29)
|
|
| Clarence S. "Hec" Edmundson Pavilion5,681
| 35–41

|- bgcolor=#fcc
| 77
| March 12
| @ San Francisco
| L 98–111
|Spencer Haywood (23)
|
|
| Oakland–Alameda County Coliseum Arena5,122
| 35–42

|- bgcolor=#cfc
| 78
| March 14
| Baltimore
| W 124–121
|Spencer Haywood (35)
|
|
| Clarence S. "Hec" Edmundson Pavilion5,810
| 36–42

|- bgcolor=#cfc
| 79
| March 18
| Milwaukee
| W 122–121
|Don Smith (28)
|
|
| Clarence S. "Hec" Edmundson Pavilion8,970
| 37–42

|- bgcolor=#fcc
| 80
| March 19
| @ Portland
| L 128–135
|Spencer Haywood (32)
|
|
| Memorial Coliseum11,140
| 37–43

|- bgcolor=#fcc
| 81
| March 20
| @ Phoenix
| L 107–114
|Jake Ford, Gar Heard (17)
|
|
| Arizona Veterans Memorial Coliseum7,134
| 37–44

|- bgcolor=#cfc
| 82
| March 21
| San Francisco
| W 119–106
|Dick Snyder (23)
|
|
| Clarence S. "Hec" Edmundson Pavilion7,634
| 38–44

Player statistics

  Statistics with the Seattle SuperSonics.

Awards and records
 Lenny Wilkens was named Most Valuable Player at the 1971 NBA All-Star Game.

Transactions

Overview

 The Sonics signed Haywood as a free agent after he spent a season with the American Basketball Association's Denver Rockets, who signed Haywood after his sophomore year at the University of Detroit Mercy under a hardship clause. Because eligibility rules of the National Basketball Association at the time required a span of four years after high school graduation for a player to be picked by any team, a legal battle ensued, with the federal court ruling in favor of Haywood.

Trades

References

Seattle
Seattle SuperSonics seasons